This is a list of trails in the U.S. state of Alabama.

By county

Autauga County
 Autauga Creek Trail, ; Prattville
 Wilderness Park Trail (a.k.a. Bamboo Park), ; Prattville
 Cooter's Pond Park Riverwalk, ; Prattville
 Jones Bluff Park (aka Bob Woodruff Park) Trail; (Selma address)
 Jasmine Trail Park, ; Prattville
 Overlook Memorial Park Walking Path, ; Prattville
 Pratt Park Walking Trail, ; Prattville
 Springhill Park Trail, ; Prattville
 Swift Creek Park Trail, Autaugaville
 Upper Kingston Park Walking Trail, ; Prattville
 YMCA - Don M. Smith Branch Trail, ; Prattville
 YMCA - Willis Bradford Branch Trail, ; Prattville

Baldwin County
 Bartram Canoe Trail, ;  Mobile–Tensaw River Delta in the area of Mobile
 Bay Minette Walking Trail, ; Bay Minette
 Bon Secour National Wildlife Refuge Trails, ; Gulf Shores
 Centennial Trail, 
 Gator Lake Trail, 
 Jeff Friend Trail, 
 Pine Beach Trail, 
 City of Foley Antique Rose Trail, ; Foley
 Eastern Shore Trail, ; Spanish Fort to Weeks Bay
 The Forever Wild Lillian Swamp Complex Nature Preserve and Recreational Area Trail(s); Lillian
 The Forever Wild Splinter Hill Bog Nature Preserve and Recreational Area Trail, ; Perdido
 Fort Morgan Road Trail, ; Gulf Shores
 Alligator Marsh, 
 Armadillo Trail, 
 Beach Mouse Bypass, 
 Bear Creek Trail, 
 Bobcat Branch, 
 Bobcat Bypass, 
 Campground Connector, 
 Campground Trail, 
 Canal Trail,  
 Cross Park Trail, 
 Eagle Connector, 
 Eagle Loop, 
 East Cabin Connector, 
 Gopher Tortoise Trail, 
 Lake Crossing, 
 Lake Shelby Overlook, 
 Lakeview Trail,  
 Middle Lake Overlook,  
 Sawgrass Trail, 
 West Cabin Connector, 
 Woodside Connector, 
 Hugh S. Banyon Backcountry Trail Complex, ; Gulf Shores and Orange Beach
 Catman Trail,  
 Cotton Bayou, 
 Coyote Crossing, 
 Gulf Oak Ridge, 
 Rattlesnake Ridge, 
 Rosemary Dunes, 
 Twin Bridges, 
 Historic Blakeley State Park Trails, ; Blakeley
 Beaver Pond Trail
 Benjamin Randall Trail
 Breastworks Trail
 Champion Tree Trail
 E.O. Wilson Boardwalk
 Forever Wild Trail
 General Cockrell's Loop
 General Garrard Trail
 General Liddell's Trail
 Hallet's Trail
 Hiding Tree Boardwalk
 Jackson Springs Trail
 Jaque Pate Trail
 John Fowler Trail
 Mott Trail
 Old Apalachee Trail
 Shell Midden Trail
 Siege Line Trail
 Squirrel's Nest Trail
 Stebbins Trail
 Taitt Trail
 Toulmin Trail
 Union Battery Loop Trail
 Warren Ross Dodge Trail
 Live Oak Landing Tensaw River Recreational Area Trails; Stockton
 Loxley Park Walking Trail, ; Loxley
 Mound Island Canoe Trail, ; Stockton
 Perdido River Wildlife Management Area Hiking Trail, ; Robertsdale
 Pioneer Park Walking Trail, ; Summerdale
 Redoubt Trail Loop, ; Spanish Fort
 Robertsdale Trail (a.k.a. Central Baldwin Rail-Trail), ; Robertsdale
 South Beach Park Trail, ; Fairhope
 Waterfront Park Trail, ; Orange Beach
 Weeks Bay National Estuarine Research Reserve Visitor Center and Nature Trails; Fairhope

Barbour County
 Eufaula National Wildlife Refuge Trails, ; Eufaula
 Artesian Well Trail, 
 Bradley Dike Cutoff Trail, 
 Nature Trail, 
 Blue Springs State Park Trails, ; Clio
 Magnolia Trail, 
 White Connector, 
 Yellow Connector, 
 Lakepoint State Park Trails,  over 7 trails; Eufaula
 Old Town Creek Trail; Eufaula
 Reed Avenue Area Walking Trail, ; Clayton
 White Oak Creek Campground Trail; Eufaula
 Yoholo-Micco Trail, ; Eufaula

Bibb County
 Brierfield Ironworks Trail, ; Brierfield
 Cahaba River National Wildlife Refuge Trails, ; West Blocton
 Loblolly Trail, 
 NE Cahaba Trail, 
 Old Refuge Road, 
 Overlook Trail, 
 Piper Interpretive Trail, 
 River Road Trail, 
 Tannehill Ironworks Historical State Park Trails, ; McCalla
 Furnace Trail
 Grist Mill Trail, 
 Iron Haul Road Extension, 
 Iron Haul Road, 
 Old Bucksville Stage Road,  
 Slave Quarters Trail, 
 Tramway Trail, 
 Tri-County Trail
 Woodstock Walking Trail, ; Woodstock

Blount County
 Bird's Foot Trail, 
 Dogwood Trail #1, 
 Dogwood Trail #2, 
 Old Road Trail, 
 Pine Trail, 
 Rockledge Trail, 
 Rocky Trail, 
 Trail of Trees, 
 Well Trail, 
 Rickwood Caverns State Park Trails, ; Warrior
 Fitness Loop,  
 Fossil Mountain Hiking Trail,  
 Moss Rock Connector Trail,  
 Picnic Loop Trail,  
 Swann Bridge Trail, ; Cleveland

Bullock County
 The Forever Wild Wehle Land Conservation Center Trail System, ; Midway
 Blue Heron Lake Dam Connector
 Bottomland Cut-off Trail, 
 Firebreak Trail, 
 Forever Wild Grove Loop
 Forever Wild Quail Ridge Loop
 Pines Trail,

Butler County
 Sherling Lake Park Trail; Greenville

Calhoun County
 Chief Ladiga Trail, ; Anniston and Esom Hill
 Dugger Mountain, ; Piedmont
 The Forever Wild Coldwater Mountain Doug Ghee Nature Preserve and Recreational Area Trail System, ; Anniston
 Genes Loop Trail, ; Joseph Springs
 Mountain Longleaf National Wildlife Refuge Trails, ; Anniston
 Alisha Lane, 
 Bailey Trail, 
 Bar S Road, 
 Bentbow Road, 
 Boundary Road, 
 Boundary Road Trail, 
 Bow String Road, 
 Briarwood Trail, 
 Collin Road, 
 Contour Road, 
 Crooked Road, 
 Davis Mountain Road, 
 Longleaf Trail, 
 Morton Mountain Road, 
 Mountain Top Trail, 
 North Fork Road, 
 Silver Ridge Road, 
 Smokey Mountain Loop, 
 South Fork Road, 
 Thornberry Trail,

Chambers County
 Amity Campground and Rocky Point Recreation Area Trails, ; Lanett
 Alligator Creek Trail, 
 Beaver Lodge Trails, 
 Chattahoochee Valley Railroad Trail, ; Valley

Cherokee County
 Cherokee Rock Village Diamond Trail System, ; Leesburg
 Blue Trail, 
 Green Trail, 
 Red Trail, 
 Tag (Orange) Trail, 
 Little River Canyon National Preserve Trails, ; Fort Payne
 Beaver Pond Trail, 
 Bridge Trail, 
 Canyon Mouth Trail, 
 DeSoto Scout Trail,  (Also traverses through Little River Canyon Wildlife Management Area and DeSoto State Park.) 
 Eberhart Trail, 
 Little Falls Trail, 
 Lower Two-Mile Trail, 
 Path To Learning Trail, 
 Powell Trail, 
 YCC Loop Trail, 
 Little River Canyon Wildlife Management Area Trails, ; Fort Payne
 Road 1, 
 Road 2, 
 Road 3 (Hartline Ford), 
 Road 4 (Billy's Ford), 
 Road 5, 
 Road 6, 
 Road 7, 
 Road 8, 
 Road 9, 
 Road 10, 
 Road 11,

Chilton County
 Confederate Memorial Park Loop, ; (Marbury address)
 Maddox Horse Camp, ; Brent
 Maplesville Town Park Trail,  with two wooden pedestrian bridges; Maplesville
 Minooka Park Trail System, ; Jemison
 The Sullivans at Evergreen; Thorsby
 Town Park Walking Trail, ; Jemison

Choctaw County
 Butler Multi-Use Trail, ; Butler
 Choctaw National Wildlife Refuge Observation Platform Trail, ; Gilbertown
 Pennington Walking Trail, ; Pennington
 Service Park Trail; Silas

Clarke County
 Silver Creek Park's Laurel Falls Trail, ; Whatley

Clay County
 Ashland Trail, ; Ashland
 Bald Rock Boardwalk, 
 Bald Rock Trail, 
 Cave Creek Trail, 
 Cheaha Express, 
 Cheaha Run, 
 Deer Run, 
 Fisherman's Trail, 
 Lake Trail, 
 Leave No Trace Bigfoot Trail, 
 Lower Spring Trail,  
 Mountain Laurel Trail, 
 Pulpit Rock Trail, 
 Upper Spring Trail, 
 Odum Scout Trail, ; Lineville

Cleburne County
 Cheaha State Park Trails, ; Delta
 Bald Rock Boardwalk, 
 Bald Rock Trail, 
 Cheaha Express, 
 Cheaha Run, 
 Deer Run, 
 Fisherman's Trail, 
 Lake Trail, 
 LNT Bigfoot Trail, 
 Lower Spring Trail,  
 Mountain Laurel Trail, 
 Pulpit Rock Trail, 
 Upper Spring Trail, 
 Chief Ladiga Trail, ; Anniston and Esom Hill
 Coleman Lake Loop, ; Fruithurst
 Pleasant Grove Community Walking Trail, ; Delta
 Ranburne Recreational Trail, ; Ranburne

Coffee County
 Enterprise Recreational Trail, ; Enterprise
 Heflin Smith's Sports Complex, ; Kinston
 Major James E. Grimes Riverwalk Trail, ; Elba

Colbert County
 Cane Creek Canyon Nature Preserve, ; Tuscumbia
 The Forever Wild Freedom Hills Trail System, ; Barton
 Blue Hole Road Loop, 
 Bugg Mill Hollow Loop, 
 McCaig Hollow Loop, 
 Mills Ridge Loop, 
 Walking Trail
 Muscle Shoals Sportsplex Trail, ; Muscle Shoals
 Sacred Tears Trail; Tuscumbia
 TVA Muscle Shoals Reservation Trails, ; Florence, Muscle Shoals, and Sheffield
 Bicycle Trail, ; Muscle Shoals and Florence
 CCC Pavilion Trail
 Energy Trail, ; Muscle Shoals
 Gunnery Fitness Trail, ; Muscle Shoals
 Jogging Trail, ; Muscle Shoals
 Low Shore Trail, ; Sheffield
 Native Plant Garden Trail, ; Sheffield
 Old First Quarters Trail Trail, ; Muscle Shoals
 Old Fitness Trail
 Old Railroad Bridge Trail, ; Muscle Shoals and Florence
 Reservation Road Trail, ; Muscle Shoals and Sheffield
 River Heritage Park Trail, ; Florence
 Rockpile Trail, ; Muscle Shoals
 Southport Historical Trail, ; Muscle Shoals
 Waterfall Walk, ; Muscle Shoals

Conecuh County
N/A

Coosa County
 Coosa Wildlife Management Area Coosa Trail, ; Rockford
 Flagg Mountain Trail System, ; Clanton
 Pink (Magenta) Trail
 White Trail
 Yellow Trail
 Pinhoti Trail, ; Weogufka

Covington County
 Conecuh National Forest Trails, ; Beda
 Conecuh Trail North Loop, 
 Conecuh Trail South Loop, 
 Five Runs Loop Trail, ; Wing
 Lake Shore Trail, ; Wing
 Open Pond Trail, ; Wing
 Florala City Park Trail, ; Florala
 Frank Jackson State Park, ; Opp
 Azalea Trail
 Dogwood Trail
 Honeysuckle Trail
 Magnolia Trail
 Seth Hammett Walkway
 Walking Trail
 Lurleen B. Wallace Community College Trail, ; Andalusia
 Solon Dixon Forestry Education Center Trails; Andalusia

Crenshaw County
 Petrey Recreational Trail, ; Petrey

Cullman County
 Ave Maria Grotto Trail, ; Cullman
 Good Hope Recreational Trail, ; Good Hope
 Holly Pond Multipurpose Trail, ; Holly Pond
 Hurricane Creek Park, ; Cullman
 Smith Lake Park Walking/Bike Trails, 
 Sportsman Lake Mountain Bicycle Trail, ; Cullman
 Stony Lonesome OHV; Bremen
 Veteran's Park Walking Trail, ; Hanceville
 Vivian T. Allen Park Trail, ; Colony
 West Point Recreational Trail, ; West Point
 Wilborn ATV Trail, ; Hanceville

Dale County
 Beaver Lake Trail, ; Fort Rucker
 Ozark Pedestrian Trail, ; Ozark

Dallas County
 The Forever Wild Old Cahawba Prairie Tract Trail System, ; Orrville
 Cahawba Trail, 
 Federal Trail, 
 Indian Trail, 
 Old Cahawba Rail Trail, 
 Old Cahawba Archaeological Park; Orrville
 Burial Grounds Trail, 
 Clear Creek Nature Trail, 
 Paul M. Grist State Park Trails, ; Selma
 Six Mile Creek Park Trail; Selma

DeKalb County
 Buck's Pocket State Park Trails, ; Grove Oak
 High Bluff Trail, 
 Indian House Trail, 
 Point Rock Trail, 
 Primitive Campground Trail, 
 South Sauty Creek Trail, 
 DeSoto State Park Trails, ; Fort Payne
 Aqua Loop Trail, 
 Blue Trail, 
 CCC Road, 
 Chalet Trail, 
 DeSoto Scout/Yellow Trail, 
 Exit 1, 
 Exit 2, 
 Exit 3, 
 Family Bike Loop, 
 Gilliam Loop, 
 Green Trail, 
 Knotty Pine MTB Trail, 
 Never Neverland Bypass, 
 Never Neverland MTB Trail, 
 Old Silver Trail, 
 Orange Silver Connector, 
 Orange Trail, 
 Quarry-Nothing Bypass, 
 Red Trail, 
 Silver Trail, 
 The Knob Exit, 
 Violet Trail, 
 Vizzney Land, 
 White Trail, 
 Fyffe Recreational Trail, ; Fyffe
 Hammondville Park Trail, ; Hammondville
 Ider Town Park Trail, ; Ider
 Powell Town Park Trail, ; Powell
 Rhododendron Trail, ; Mentone

Elmore County
 Alabama Nature Center Trails, ; Millbrook
 Hilltop Pass, 
 Still Creek Run, 
 Turkey Ridge, 
 Corn Creek Nature Trail, ; Wetumpka
 Fort Toulouse-Fort Jackson Park, ; Wetumpka
 Bartram Nature Trail, 
 Harvest Fields Community Church Walking Trail, ; Deatsville
 The Forever Wild Gothard-AWF Yates Lake Wildlife Management Area Trail System, ; (Dadeville address)
 John B. Scott Forever Wild Trail, 
 Cherokee Bluffs Dam Railroad (Highline) Trail, 
 Cherokee Bluffs Dam Railroad (Lowline) Trail, 
 Gold Star Park Walking Trail, ; Wetumpka
 Legacy Park Walking Trail, ; Millbrook
 Mill Creek Sports Complex Walking Trail, ; Millbrook
 Minnie Massey Park Walking Trail, ; Millbrook
 Panther Palace Walking Trail, ; Eclectic
 Swayback Bridge Trail, ; Wetumpka
 Village Green Walking Trail, ; Millbrook

Escambia County
 Houston Avery Park, ; Atmore
 Little River State Forest & Claude D. Kelley Recreational Area Trails, ; Atmore
 Bell-CCC Loop, 
 Gazebo Trail, 
 Magnolia Branch Wildlife Reserve, ; Atmore
 Tom Byrne Park, ; Atmore

Etowah County
 Hokes Bluff Walking Trail, ; Hokes Bluff
 Martin Wildlife Park Trail, ; Gadsden
 Noccalula Falls Park Trails, ; Gadsden
 Black Creek Bend, 
 Black Creek Trail, 
 Cascade Trail, 
 Family Loop, 
 Jeep Hill Connector, 
 Jeep Hill Loop, 
 Moonshine Ridge, 
 Whatley Trail, 
 Sardis Recreational Trail, ; Sardis City
 Sumatanga Mountain Loop, ; Gallant

Fayette County
 Berry Walking Trail, ; Berry

Franklin County
 Bobcat Hollow ATV Trails, ; Phil Campbell
 Dismals Canyon, ; Phil Campbell
 Hoyt Keeton Trail, ; Red Bay
 Rocky Branch Park Trail, ; Spruce Pine

Geneva County
 High Bluff Trail, ; Hartford
 L&N Railroad Depot Walking Trail, ; Geneva

Greene County
 Boligee Walking Trail, ; Boligee
 Forkland Park Nature Trail, ; Forkland

Hale County
 Akron Park Trail, ; Akron
 Jennings Ferry Park Nature Trail, ; Akron
 Lions Park Trail, ; Greensboro
 Moundville Archaeological Park Nature Trail, ; Moundville
 Payne Lake Nature Trail, ; Moundville
 Seldon Lock and Dam Trail; Sawyerville
 Una Martin Leisure Park Trail, ; Greensboro

Henry County
 Hardridge Creek Campground Trail; Abbeville
 Highland Park Trail; Abbeville

Houston County
 Chattahoochee Trail, ; Gordon
 Dothan Area Botanicals Garden, ; Dothan
 Eastgate Park Walking Trail, ; Dothan
 The Forever Wild Trails at Beaver Creek, ; Dothan
 Beaver Tail Flats, 
 Big Levee, 
 Big Levee Advanced Loop, 
 Connector A, 
 Connector B, 
 Dragon's Tail, 
 Dragon's Tail Advanced Loop, 
 SAM's Creekside Trail, 
 Stagecoach Plateau, 
 Wall Ride Loop, 
 Zion Cemetery Ridge, 
 Omussee Creek Park Trail; Columbia
 The Parkman Boardwalk, ; Dothan
 Troy University at Dothan Trail, ; Dothan
 Walton Park Walking Trail, ; Dothan
 Kiwanis Park Trail
 Larry and Ronna Dykes Trail,

Jackson County
 Cathedral Caverns State Park Trails, ; Woodville
 Blue Trail, 
 Gray Trail, 
 Green Trail, 
 Yellow Trail, 
 The Forever Wild Walls of Jericho Trail System, ; Hytop
 Bear Den Loop, 
 South Rim Trail, 
 Tennessee Trail
 Walls of Jericho Horseback Riding Trail, 
 Walls of Jericho Trail, 
 Goose Pond Colony Nature and Walking Trail, ; Scottsboro
 Historic Bridgeport Walking Trail, ; Bridgeport
 Lost Sink Trail, ; Paint Rock
 Pisgah Gorge, ; Pisgah
 River Mont Cave Historical Trail; Bridgeport
 Russell Cave National Monument Trail, ; Bridgeport
 Scottsboro City Park Walking Trail, ; Scottsboro

Jefferson County
 16th Street Walking Trail, ; Irondale
 Aldridge Gardens Trail, ; Hoover
 Bessemer Rail Trail, ; Bessemer
 Aqueduct Greenway, ; Tarrant
 Connector, 
 North, 
 South, 
 Big Mountain Loop, ; Trussville
 Birmingham Botanical Gardens Walking Trail, ; Birmingham
 Birmingham Eastside EcoGardens Trail, ; Birmingham
 Black Creek Trail, ; Fultondale
 Boulder Canyon Loop, ; Vestavia Hills
 Brookside Greenway, ; Brookside
 Cahaba River Greenway II (a.k.a. Civitan Park Trail), ; Trussville
 Chace Lake Trail, ; Hoover
 Chapel Hills Trail, ; Fultondale
 Civil Rights Trail, ; Birmingham
 Clairmont Walking Trail, ; Birmingham
 Cosby Lake Greenway, ; Pinson
 East Lake Park Loop, ; Birmingham
 East Lake to Roebuck Park Greenway, ; Birmingham
 Ensley Park Greenway, ; Birmingham
 Ensley Park Trail, ; Birmingham
 Ensley-Pratt Greenway (a.k.a. Village Creek Greenway Phase 1), ; Birmingham
 Enon Ridge Trail (a.k.a. Dorothy Spears Greenway), ; Birmingham
 Five Mile Creek Greenway, ; Fultondale and Gardendale
 Black Creek Park Segment, ; Fultondale
 Black Creek Park Side Trail to Creek, ; Fultondale
 Gardendale Segment, ; Gardendale
 Flora Johnson Nature Trail, ; Irondale
 Gardendale Urban Trail System, ; Gardendale
 George Ward Exercise Park, ; Birmingham
 High Ore Line Trail, ; Birmingham
 Homewood Forest Preserve Trail, ; Homewood
 Howze-Sanford Greenway, ; Birmingham
 Irondale Furnace Trail, ; Mountain Brook
 Irondale Greenway (a.k.a. Cahaba Riverwalk), ; Irondale
 Jefferson State Community College Combo, ; Birmingham
 Jemison Park Nature Trail, ; Hoover
 Jones Valley Trail, ; Birmingham
 Levite Jewish Community Center Trail, ; Mountain Brook
 Little Shades Greenway, ; Vestavia Hills
 Maplebridge-Horseshoe Ramble, ; Trussville
 McCallum Park Trail, ; Vestavia Hills
 MLK Jr. Drive Greenway, ; Fairfield
 Moccasin Trail; Birmingham
 Moss Rock Preserve Trails, ; Hoover
 Red Trail, 
 Orange Trail, 
 Blue Trail, 
 Powerline Trail, 
 White Trail, 
 Norwood Greenway, ; Birmingham
 Oak Hill Cemetery Walk, ; Birmingham
 Patchwork Farms Greenway, ; Vestavia Hills
 Railroad Park Rail Trails, ; Birmingham
 Reed Harvey Park Community Wetland Greenway, ; Center Point
 Reed Harvey Park Greenway, ; Center Point
 Red Mountain Preserve Trail System, ; Birmingham
 #10 Mine Trail, 
 #13 Mine Trail, 
 #14 Mine Trail, 
 BMRR North Trail, 
 BMRR South Trail, 
 Eureka Mines Trail, 
 Ike Maston Trail, 
 Ishkooda Trail, 
 L&N Trail, 
 Redding Trail, 
 Skyhy Ridge Walk, 
 Smythe Trail, 
 Songo Trail, 
 Spring Gap Trail, 
 Stairway to #11, 
 TCI Connector Trail, 
 Wenonah Connector, 
 Ross Bridge Greenway, ; Hoover
 Rotary Trail, ; Birmingham
 Ruffner Mountain Preserve Trail System, ; Birmingham
 Buckeye Trail, 
 Crusher Trail, 
 Eastern Trailhead, 
 Geology Trail, 
 Lizard Loop, 
 Marian Harnach Nature Trail, 
 Overlook Trail, 
 Pipeline Trail, 
 Possum Loop Trail, 
 Quarry Trail, 
 Ridge and Valley Trail, 
 Sandstone Ridge, 
 Silent Journey, 
 Trillium Trail, 
 Wetlands Trail, 
 Shades Creek Greenway (a.k.a. Lakeshore Trail), ; Homewood
 Sloss Furnaces Trail, ; Birmingham
 Tannehill Ironworks Historical State Park Trails, ; McCalla
 Furnace Trail
 Grist Mill Trail, 
 Iron Haul Road Extension, 
 Iron Haul Road, 
 Old Bucksville Stage Road,  
 Slave Quarters Trail, 
 Tramway Trail, 
 Tri-County Trail
 Trussville Sports Complex Trail, ; Trussville
 Turkey Creek Nature Preserve Trail System, ; Pinson
 Boy Scout Trail, 
 Hanby Hollow, 
 Highlands Trail,  
 Narrows Ridge, 
 Thompson Trace, 
 Veterans Park Greenway, ; Hoover
 Vulcan Trail, ; Birmingham
 West End Walking Trail Park; Birmingham
 Wildwood Preserve Trail, ; Birmingham

Lamar County
N/A

Lauderdale County
 The Forever Wild Billingsley-McClure Shoal Creek Nature Preserve and Recreation Center Trail System, ; Florence
 Jones Branch Loop, 
 Horse Trail, 
 Lawson Branch Loop, 
 Joe Wheeler State Park Trail System,  ; Rogersville
 Blue Trail,  
 Jimmy Sim's Trail,  
 Luther's Cutoff,  
 Luther's Pass,  
 Page Farm Trail,  
 Punisher,  
 Red Trail,  
 Sammy Hardin Loop,  
 Yellow Trail,  
 TVA Muscle Shoals Reservation Trails, ; Florence, Muscle Shoals, and Sheffield
 Bicycle Trail, ; Muscle Shoals and Florence
 Energy Trail, ; Muscle Shoals
 Gunnery Fitness Trail, ; Muscle Shoals
 Jogging Trail, ; Muscle Shoals
 Low Shore Trail, ; Sheffield
 Native Plant Garden Trail, ; Sheffield
 Old First Quarters Trail Trail, ; Muscle Shoals
 Old Railroad Bridge Trail, ; Muscle Shoals and Florence
 Reservation Road Trail, ; Muscle Shoals and Sheffield
 River Heritage Park Trail, ; Florence
 Rockpile Trail, ; Muscle Shoals
 Southport Historical Trail, ; Muscle Shoals
 Waterfall Walk, ; Muscle Shoals
 Wildwood Park Trail; Florence

Lawrence County
 H.A. Alexander Mini Park Trail, ; Moulton
 Joe Wheeler State Park Trail System,  ; Rogersville
 Southside Multiuse Trail,  ; Red Bank
 William B. Bankhead National Forest Trails, ; Double Springs
 Flint Creek Multiuse Trail System, ; Piney Grove
 Red Loop (268B), 
 White Loop (268A), 
 Kinlock Shelter Trail, ; Pebble
 Owl Creek Non-Motorized Trail System, ; Wren
 Brushey Creek Horse - Blue Loop (220), 
 Key Mill Horse - Orange Loop (221), 
 Pine Torch Horse - Yellow Loop (222), 
 Sipsey Wilderness Trails, ; Moulton
 Bee Branch Trail (204), 
 Borden Creek Trail (200), 
 Braziel Creek Trail (207), 
 Bunyan Hill Trail (224), 
 Gum Pond Trail (223), 
 Lookout Trail (203), 
 Mitchell Ridge Trail (210), 
 Northwest Trail (208), 
 Randolph Trail (202), 
 Rippey Trail (201), 
 Sipsey River Trail (209), 
 Thompson Creek Trail (206),

Lee County
 Bandy Park Walking Track, ; Opelika
 Charlotte and Curtis Ward Bike Path, ; Auburn
 Armadillo Alley
 Base CAMP Trail
 Boy Scout Trail
 CAMP's Trail
 CCC Trail
 Deer Rub Trail
 Dell's Trail
 Eagle Scout Trail
 Falls View Trail
 Flo-Rida
 For Pete's Sake
 Fox Trail
 Groundhogs Day
 High Gravity
 Kick Six
 Lakeside Connector
 Mama's Milkshake
 Mountain Laurel Trail
 NORBA Trail
 Old Skool
 Rock Bottom
 Sweet Shrub Trail
 Tiger Woods
 Troop 30 Trail
 Duncan Wright Fitness Trail, ; Auburn
 Kiesel Park Trail, ; Auburn
 Kreher Preserve & Nature Center Trails, ; Auburn
 Lake Wilmore Trail, ; Auburn
 MC Horsemanship Trails, ; Auburn
 North Technology Loop, ; Auburn
 Sam Harris Park, ; Auburn
 South Technology Park Trail, ; Auburn
 Stern Dog Park Walking Trail, ; Opelika
 Town Creek Park Trail, ; Auburn
 West Ridge Park Walking Track, ; Opelika
 Wood Duck Heritage Preserve & Siddique Nature Park, ; Opelika
 Inner Lagoon trail
 Lagoon Loop
 Siddique Loop
 Wetland Trail

Limestone County
 Limestone County Canoe & Kayak Trail, ; Elk River
 Richard Martin Trail (a.k.a. Limestone Rail-Trail), ; Elkmont
 TVA Marbut Bend Trail, ; Elkmont
 Swan Creek Greenway Trail, ; Athens

Lowndes County
 Fort Deposit Town Park Trail, ; Fort Deposit
 Holy Ground Battlefield Park Trail, White Hall
 Prairie Creek Campground Trail, Lowndesboro
 Ruby S. Moore Park Walking Trail, ; Lowndesboro

Macon County
 Tuskegee National Forest Trails, ; Tuskegee
 Bartram National Recreation Trail, ; Tuskegee
 Bold Destiny/Bedford V. Cash Memorial Trail, ; Tuskegee
 Pleasant Hill Trail, ; Tuskegee

Madison County
 Aldridge Creek Greenway, ; Huntsville
 Atwood Drive Linear Park, ; Huntsville
 Bethel Spring Nature Preserve Trails, ; Gurley
 Bethel Creek Loop, 
 Carpenter Trail, 
 Falling Sink Trail, 
 Mill Trail, 
 Big Cove Creek Greenway, ; Huntsville
 Big Spring Park, ; Huntsville
 Blevins Gap Nature Preserve Trails, ; Huntsville
 Bailey Cove Trail, 
 Bill & Marion Certain Trail, 
 Chittamwood Trail, 
 Fanning Trail, 
 Jones Valley Loop Trail, 
 Lowry Trail, 
 Scout Trail, 
 Smokerise Trail, 
 Stevenson Trail, 
 Sugar Tree Trail, 
 Varnedoe Trail, 
 Walsingham Connector, 
 Walsingham Trail, 
 West Bluff Trail, 
 Bradford Creek Greenway, ; Madison
 Burritt on the Mountain Trails, ; Huntsville
 Big Cove Turnpike Trail
 Discovery Trails
 Oak Tree Trail
 Rock Bluff Trail
 Trough Springs Trail
 Cavalry Hills Park Walking Trail, ; Huntsville
 Chapman Mountain Nature Preserve Trails, ; Huntsville
 Amphitheater Trail, 
 Chasco Trail, 
 Driskell Trail, 
 Moonshine Trail, 
 Terry Trail, 
 Whole Planet Trail, 
 Charles Stone Memorial Park Trail, ; Gurley
 Dublin Park Walking Trail, ; Madison
 Gateway Greenway, ; Huntsville
 Green Mountain Nature Preserve Trails, ; Huntsville
 Alum Hollow Trail, 
 East Plateau Trail, 
 West Plateau Trail, 
 Stonefly Trail, 
 Talus Trail, 
 Ranger Trail, 
 Talus Connector, 
 Oak Bluff Trail, 
 Three Sisters Loop, 
 Harvest Square Nature Preserve Trails, ; Harvest
 Beaver Dam Trail, 
 Dry Creek Trail, 
 Eagle Trail, 
 Lookout Point Trail, 
 Pete’s Trail, 
 Senators Trail, 
 Hays Nature Preserve; Huntsville
 Huntsville Botanical Garden; Huntsville
 Huntsville Cross Country Running Park, ; Huntsville
 Indian Creek Greenway, ; Huntsville
 Little Cove Road Greenway, ; Huntsville
 Madison County Nature Trail, ; Huntsville
 Mill Creek Greenway, ; Madison
 Monte Sano State Park Trails, ; Huntsville
 Fire Tower Trail
 McKay Hollow Trail
 Mountain Mist Loop, 
 North Plateau Loop, 
 South Plateau Loop, 
 Monte Sano Nature Preserve Trails, ; Huntsville
 Alms House Trail, 
 Annandale Trail
 Arrowhead Trail
 Bankhead Trail, 
 Bluff Line Trail, 
 Bushwacker Johnson Trail, 
 Buzzards Roost Trail, 
 Cold Spring Trail, 
 Dallas Branch Trail, 
 Discovery Trail, 
 Dummy Line Trail, 
 Fagan Springs Trail, 
 Gaslight Trail, 
 High Trail, 
 Hotel Basin, 
 Natural Well Trail
 Oak Park Trail, 
 Old Railroad Bed Trail (a.k.a. Monte Sano Railroad Trail), 
 Quarry Road, 
 Sink Hole Trail, 
 Three Caves Loop, 
 Toll Gate Trail, 
 Trough Springs Trail, 
 Wagon Trail, 
 Waterline Trail, 
 Watts Trail, 
 Wildflower Trail, 
 Young-Kennedy Trail, 
 Phillips Park Pedestrian Trail, ; Huntsville
 Rainbow Mountain Nature Preserve Trails, ; Madison
 Balance Rock Trail, 
 Rainbow Loop Trail, 
 High Pass Trail, 
 Ja Moo Ko Loop Trail, 
 Jake Loop Trail, 
 Spring Trail, 
 Wild Trail, 
 Redstone Arsenal Fitness Trail, ; Redstone Arsenal
 Redstone Gateway Greenway (a.k.a. EUL Greenway), ; Madison
 Tennessee River Greenway, ; Huntsville
 Trojan Trail, ; Hazel Green
 Wade Mountain Nature Preserve Trails, ; Huntsville
 Bostick Trail, 
 Cotton Valley Trail, 
 Devils Racetrack, 
 Flemming Trail, 
 Fossil Bench Trail, 
 Harris Trail, 
 Low Peak Trail, 
 NICA Trail, 
 Piney Loop Trail, 
 Rock Wall Trail, 
 Shovelton Trail, 
 Wade Mountain Greenway, 
 Wade Mountain Greenway Trail, 
 Wade Mountain Trail,

Marengo County
 Demopolis Sportsplex Multipurpose Trail, ; Demopolis
 Foscue Creek Park Nature Trail, ; Demopolis
 Spillway Falls Park Trails, ; Demopolis
 Bigbee Bottom Trail, 
 Bigbee Bottom Lower Pool Hiking Trail,

Marion County
 Ivan K. Hill Park Nature Trail; Winfield

Marshall County
 Albertville Community Walking Trail, ; Albertville
 Arab City Park Trail, ; Arab
 Lake Guntersville State Park Trails, ; Guntersville
 Butler's Pass,  
 Cascade Trail,  
 Cave Alternative Trail,  
 Cave Trail,  
 Cutchenmine Trail,  
 Daniel's Trail,  
 Golf Course Loop Trail,  
 King's Chapel Trail,  
 Lickskillet Trail,  
 Little Mountain Horse Trail,  
 Lodge Trail
 Main Horse Trail,  
 Meredith Trail,  
 Moonshine Trail,  
 Nature Trail,  
 Old Lickskillet Trail,  
 Old Still Path,  
 Seale's Trail,  
 Spring Trail,  
 Spring Trail,  
 Store Horse Trail,  
 Stubblefield Loop Horse Trail,  
 Taylor Mountain Trail,  
 Terrell Connector Trail,  
 Terrell Trail,  
 Tom Bevill Trail,  
 Village Ford Horse Trail,  
 Waterfall Trail
 Sunset Drive Trail, ; Guntersville
 Thompson-Eidson Park Trail, ; Arab
 TVA Cave Mountain Small Wild Area Trail, ; Guntersville
 TVA Cooley Cemetery Trail, ; Guntersville
 TVA Honeycomb Creek Small Wild Area Trail, ; Guntersville
 TVA Buck Island Small Wild Area Trail, ; Guntersville

Mobile County
 Audubon Sanctuary Trails, ; Dauphin Island
 Chickasabogue Park Trail, ; Mobile
 Citronelle Walking Trail, ; Citronelle
 The Forever Wild Jacinto Port Tract Trail System, ; Saraland
 Bayou Sara Loop Trail, 
 Brickport Trail, 
 Furnace Hill Trail, 
 Longleaf Trail, 
 Northridge Trail, 
 Turkey Cutoff Trail, 
 The Forever Wild Grand Bay Savanna Nature Preserve Boardwalk, ; Bayou La Batre
 Mobile Airport Perimeter Trail, ; Mobile
 Muddy Creek Interpretive Nature Trail, ; Mobile
 Taylor Harper Hiking and Cycling Trail, ; Dauphin Island

Monroe County
 Bells Landing Park Trail; Hybart
 CCC Trail, ; Uriah
 Claiborne Lake Dam Site East Park's Cypress Swamp Trail; Franklin
 Claiborne Lake Dam Site West Park Trail; Franklin
 Haines Island Park Trails, ; Franklin
 Big-Leaf Magnolia Nature Trail, 
 Lower Ironwood Trail, 
 Upper Ironwood Trail, 
 Isaac Creek Campground Trail; Hybart
 Tunnel Springs Rail Trail, ; Tunnel Springs

Montgomery County
 Auburn University at Montgomery Hiking & Biking Trails, ; Montgomery
 Course A, 
 Course B, 
 Course C, 
 Entry Path, 
 Buddy Watson Park Walking Trail; Montgomery
 Calhoun Park Walking Trail; Montgomery
 Catoma Park Walking Trail, ; Montgomery
 Cloverdale Road Park Walking Trail; Montgomery
 Dorchester Park Walking Trail; Montgomery
 Exchange Park Walking Trail; Montgomery
 Fairview Environmental Park Walking Trail; Montgomery
 Flatwood Community Center Walking Trail, ; Boylston
 Fox Hollow Park Walking Trail, ; Montgomery
 Freedom Park Walking Trail; Maxwell Air Force Base
 Gateway Park Walking Trails; Montgomery
 Gunter Hill Campground Trails, ; Montgomery
 Loop A
 Loop B
 Hyde Park Walking Trail; Montgomery
 Ida Belle Young Park Walking Trail, ; Montgomery
 James A. Shannon Park Walking Trail; Montgomery
 Lagoon Park Trails, ; Montgomery
 Creek Trail,  
 Forest Road Trail,  
 Oak Glen,  
 Piney Woods Loop,  
 Single Track Trail,  
 Vita Course,  
 Leu Hammonds Park Walking Trail; Montgomery
 Oak Park Walking Trail; Montgomery
 Peter Crump Park Walking Trail; Montgomery
 Pike Road Natural Trail; Pike Road
 Pine Level Park Trail, ; Pine Level
 Pintlala Park Walking Trail, ; Pintlala
 Ramer Park Walking Trail, ; Ramer
 Snowdoun Park Trail, ; Snowdoun
 Vaughn Road Park Walking Trail, ; Montgomery
 Virginia Estates Park Walking Trail, ; Montgomery
 Wares Ferry Park Walking Trail; Montgomery
 Washington Park Walking Trail; Montgomery
 Waugh Park Walking Trail, ; Waugh
 Wayne Enzor Park Walking Trail, ; Lapine
 Wingard Park Walking Trail, ; Grady
 Woodcrest Park Walking Trail; Montgomery
 Woodmere Park Walking Trail, ; Montgomery
 Wynton M. Blount Cultural Park Trails, ; Montgomery

Morgan County
 Decatur Trail (a.k.a. Dr. Bill Sims Hike-Bike Way, ; Decatur
 Point Mallard Park Trail, ; Decatur
 Wheeler National Wildlife Refuge Trails, ; Decatur
 Atkeson Cypress Trail, 
 Beaverdam Swamp Boardwalk, 
 Dancy Bottoms Trail, 
 Flint Creek Trail,

Perry County
 Georgia Walker Memorial Walking Trail, ; Marion
 Perry Lakes Trail, ; Marion

Pickens County
 Pickensville Campground Trail; Pickensville

Pike County
 The Forever Wild Pike County Pocosin Complex Trail; Troy
 Heart of Dixie Trail Ride Trails, ; Troy

Randolph County
 Flat Rock Park Nature Walk; Lineville (closest town)
 Woodland Sports Complex Trail, ; Woodland

Russell County
 Idle Hour Nature Trail, ; Phenix City

St. Clair County
 Argo Walking Trail, ; Argo
 Horse Pens 40 Park Trail, ; Steele
 Pell City Lakeside Park Trails, ; Pell City
 Springville Trail, ; Springville
 Ten Islands Historic Park Nature Trail; Ragland

Shelby County
 Abby Wooley Park Walking Trail, ; Alabaster
 Akridge Arboretum Park Walking Trail, ; Calera
 Beeswax Creek Park on Lay Lake Trail, ; Columbiana
 Blue Cross and Blue Shield of Alabama Fitness Trail at University Lake, University of Montevallo, ; Montevallo
 Blue Ridge Park Trails, ; Hoover
 Buck Creek Greenway, ; Alabaster
 Cahaba Lily Park Nature Trail, ; Helena
 Cahaba River Park Trail System, ; Helena
 Cahaba Shoals Loop
 Flying Squirrel Trail
 Northern Pines Trail
 Reflection Trail
 Rust Bucket Trail
 Shoal 'Nuff Trail
 Turtleback Ridge Trail
 Whitetail Trail
 Wild Turkey Trail
 Without A Paddle Trail
 Chelsea Recreational Park Walking Track, ; Chelsea
 Coker Park Walking Track, ; Pelham
 Columbiana Sports Complex Walking Trail, ; Columbiana
 The Dog Park at Loch Haven Walking Track, ; Hoover
 Falling Rock Falls Hike, ; Montevallo
 Forest Park and Recreational Area Walking Trail, ; Sterrett
 Fun Go Holler Park Walking Track, ; Pelham
 George W. Roy Recreational Park Walking Trail, ; Calera
 Gorman Park Walking Trail, ; Vincent
 Heardmont Park Trail, ; Hoover
 Hillsboro Trail, ; Helena
 Heroes Park Walking Trail, ; Alabaster
 Inverness Nature Park Trails, ; Hoover
 J. W. Donahoo Park Walking Trail, ; Harpersville
 Joe Tucker Park Walking Trail, ; Helena
 Limestone Park Nature Trail, ; Alabaster
 Montevallo Greenway, ; Montevallo
 Moss Rock Preserve Trails, ; Hoover
 Red Trail, 
 Orange Trail, 
 Blue Trail, 
 Powerline Trail, 
 White Trail, 
 Oak Meadow Park Walking Trail, ; Wilsonville
 Oak Mountain State Park Trails, ; Pelham
 Blue Trail (Hikers only),  
 Eagle's Nest Overlook,  
 Falls Creek Trail, 
 Green Trail (Hikers only), 
 Green-Red Connector, 
 Green-Yellow Connector, 
 Green-Yellow Ridge Trail, 
 Green-White Connector, 
 King's Chair Overlook, 
 Orange Connector,  
 Orange Trail System (Horses and Hikers only), over  
 Cabin Lake Trail
 Christmas Tree Trail
 Creek Valley Loop
 Group Camp Road
 Lake Loop
 Ridge Trail
 Rock Garden Trail
 Treatment Plant Trail
 Valley Trail
 Wildlife Cages Trail
 Peavine Falls Trail,  
 Red Road (Bikers and Hikers),  
 Red-Blue Connector North,  
 Red-Blue Connector South,  
 Red-White Connector, 
 Red Trail System (Bikers and Hikers), over 
 Boulder Ridge, 
 BUMP Connector, 
 BUMP Trail, 
 Cat Dog Snake, 
 Centipede, 
 The Chimneys, 
 Family Trail, 
 Foreplay, 
 Garrett's Gulch, 
 Group Camp Road to Garrett's Gulch, 
 Jekyll n Hyde, 
 Johnson's Mountain, 
 Lake Trail, 
 Lightning, 
 Mr. Toad's Wild Ride, 
 Rattlesnake Ridge, 
 Red Road (Boulder Ridge to BUMP Trail), 
 Seven Bridges, 
 Thunder, 
 West Ridge, 
 Rim Shelter Trail,  
 Treetop Nature Trail (Hikers only),  
 Scenic Creek Overlook Trail 
 White Trail (Hikers only),  
 White-Blue Connector, 
 Yellow Trail (Hikers only), 
 Yellow-Red Connector, 
 Yellow-White Connector,  
 Oliver Park Nature Trail, ; Calera
 Orr Park Trail, ; Montevallo
 Pea Ridge Community Park Walking Trail, ; Montevallo
 Pelham City Park Complex Walking Track, ; Pelham
 Russet Woods Park Walking Trail, ; Hoover
 Shoal Creek Park Trail, ; Montevallo
 Star Lake Park Walking Trail, ; Hoover
 Stephen's Park Walking Trail, ; Montevallo
 Sterrett Park Walking Track, ; Sterrett
 University of Phoenix Walking Trail, ; Meadowbrook
 Vandiver Park Walking Trail, ; Vandiver
 Veterans Park Walking Trail, ; Alabaster
 Veterans Park Trail, ; Hoover
 Vincent Municipal Park Walking Trail, ; Vincent
 Westover Park Walking Trail, ; Westover
 Wildflower Walking Trail, ; Hoover

Sumter County
 The University of West Alabama Wise Loop, ; Livingston

Talladega County
 Kentuck ORV Trail, ; Oxford
 Logan Martin Dam Park Hiking Trail (a.k.a. Double Cove Park), ; Alpine
 Pinecrest Veterans Park Trail, ; Sylacauga
 Sylaward Trail, ; Sylacauga
 Talladega Springs Historical Trail; Talladega Springs

Tallapoosa County
 Charles E. Bailey, Sr. Sportplex Nature Trail, ; Alexander City
 Cherokee Ridge Alpine Trails at Overlook Park, ; Cherokee Bluffs
 Cherokee Ridge Alpine Trail, 
 Chimney Rock Loop Trail, 
 Kowaliga Bay Loop Trail, 
 The Forever Wild Coon Creek Nature Preserve and Recreation Area Trail System, ; Tallassee
 Overlook Trail, 
 Wood Duck Trail, 
 Holly Hills Trail; Jackson's Gap
 Horseshoe Bend National Military Park Nature Trail, ; Daviston
 James M. Scott Deadening Alpine Trail, ; Cherokee Bluffs
 2-day Loop
 Adamson Trail
 Barn Loop
 Big Way, 
 Branch Loop 
 Carriage Way
 Dark Valley Loop
 East Crossroads Loop
 East/West Rail
 Frontier Trails
 Garnet Mine Loop
 Green Way
 Heavenly Loop
 Horsely Creek Loop
 Kowaliga Trace
 Lakeside Loop
 Lakeview Trail
 Link Way, 
 Long Leaf Loop
 Lover's Loop
 Old Kowaliga Trail
 Pitchford Creek Trail
 Pony Express
 Ridge Trail
 Rock Bottom
 Rocky Mount Loop
 Stables Loop
 Turtle Back Loop
 Wind Way, 
 Smith Mountain Fire Tower Trails, ; Jackson's Gap
 David M. Forker Island Hop and Boat Dock Trail, 
 Lakeshore Trail, 
 Little Smith Mountain Loop Trail, 
 Walker Bynum Smith Mountain Tower Trail, 
 Strand Park Walking Trail; Alexander City
 Wind Creek State Park Trails, ; Alexander City
 Blue Trail, 
 Orange Trail, 
 Reunion Trail, 
 Speckled Snake Trail, 
 Yellow Trail,

Tuscaloosa County
 Annette M. Shelby Park Trail, ; Tuscaloosa
 Bowers Park Trail, ; Tuscaloosa
 Coaling Town Park Walking Trail, ; Tuscaloosa
 Deerlick Creek Campground Trails, ; Cottondale
 Gobbler Ridge Hiking Trail, 
 Beech Tree Hollow Trail, 
 Jaycee Park Trail, ; Tuscaloosa
 Kentuck Park Trail, ; Tuscaloosa
 Lake Lurleen State Park Tashka Trail System, ; Coker
 5 Oaks Loop Trail, 
 Lakeside Trail, 
 Lightning Loop Trail, 
 Ridge Loop Trail, 
 Roadway, 
 Storm Loop Trail, 
 Tashka Trail, 
 Tornado Loop Trail, 
 Monnish Park Multi-Use Trail, ; Tuscaloosa
 Munny Sokol Trails, ; Tuscaloosa
 Palmore Park Trail, ; Tuscaloosa
 Queen City Park Trail, ; Tuscaloosa
 Richard L. Platt Memorial Levee Trail, ; Tuscaloosa
 River Road East Park, ; Tuscaloosa
 Rocky Branch Trail, ; Tuscaloosa
 Snow Hinton Trail, ; Tuscaloosa
 Tannehill Ironworks Historical State Park Trails, ; McCalla
 Furnace Trail
 Grist Mill Trail, 
 Iron Haul Road Extension, 
 Iron Haul Road, 
 Old Bucksville Stage Road,  
 Slave Quarters Trail, 
 Tramway Trail, 
 Tri-County Trail

Walker County
 Horse Creek Trail, ; Dora and Sumiton
 Sumiton Trail, ; Sumiton

Washington County
 Old St. Stephens Historical Park Trails; St. Stephens

Wilcox County
 Bridgeport Beach Trail; Camden
 Chilatchee Creek Park Trail; Alberta
 Holleys Ferry Park Trail; Camden
 Millers Ferry Campground Trail; Millers Ferry
 Roland Cooper State Park Trails; Camden

Winston County
 KC Ranch Horse Camp, ; Double Springs
 Lakeside Trail, ; Haleyville
 William B. Bankhead National Forest Trails, ; Double Springs
 Sipsey Wilderness Trails, ; Moulton
 Borden Creek Trail (200), 
 Randolph Trail (202), 
 Rippey Trail (201), 
 Sipsey River Trail (209),

See also

 List of Hiking Trails in the United States

References

Lists of hiking trails in the United States
Transportation in the United States
Hiking trails in Alabama